Pachygaster is a genus of flies in the family Stratiomyidae.

Pachygaster differ from other Pachygastrinae morphologically in that their wings have separate R4 and R5 radial veins, their scutellum lacks a distinct posterior rim, and the hairs on the sides of their mesonotum are not flattened.

Species
Pachygaster annulipes Brunetti, 1920
Pachygaster antiquus James, 1971
Pachygaster atra (Panzer, 1797)
Pachygaster characta Kraft & Cook, 1961
Pachygaster dorsalis Lindner, 1957
Pachygaster emerita Krivosheina & Freidberg, 2004
Pachygaster flavimana Lindner, 1957
Pachygaster flavipennis Hull, 1942
Pachygaster hymenaea Grund & Hauser, 2005
Pachygaster kerteszi Szilády, 1941
Pachygaster leachii Curtis, 1824
Pachygaster maura Lindner, 1939
Pachygaster montana Kraft & Cook, 1961
Pachygaster piriventris Rozkošný & Kovac, 1998
Pachygaster pulcher Loew, 1863
Pachygaster subatra Krivosheina, 2004
Pachygaster wirthi James, 1967

References

Stratiomyidae
Brachycera genera
Taxa named by Johann Wilhelm Meigen
Diptera of Asia
Diptera of Europe
Diptera of North America